Théophile Ernest de Donder (19 August 1872 – 11 May 1957) was a Belgian mathematician, physicist and chemist famous for his work (published in 1923) in developing correlations between the Newtonian concept of chemical affinity and the Gibbsian concept of free energy.

Education
He received his doctorate in physics and mathematics from the Université Libre de Bruxelles in 1899, for a thesis entitled Sur la Théorie des Invariants Intégraux (On the Theory of Integral Invariants).

Career
He was professor between 1911 and 1942, at the Université Libre de Bruxelles. Initially he continued the work of Henri Poincaré and Élie Cartan. From 1914 on, he was influenced by the work of Albert Einstein and was an enthusiastic proponent of the theory of relativity. He gained significant reputation in 1923, when he developed his definition of chemical affinity. He pointed out a connection between the chemical affinity and the Gibbs free energy.

He is considered the father of thermodynamics of irreversible processes.  De Donder's work was later developed further by Ilya Prigogine. De Donder was an associate and friend of Albert Einstein.
He was in 1927, one of the participants of the fifth Solvay Conference on Physics, that took place at the International Solvay Institute for Physics in Belgium.

Books by De Donder
 Thermodynamic Theory of Affinity: A Book of Principles. Oxford, England: Oxford University Press (1936)
 The Mathematical Theory of Relativity. Cambridge, MA: MIT (1927)
 Sur la théorie des invariants intégraux (thesis) (1899).
 Théorie du champ électromagnétique de Maxwell-Lorentz et du champ gravifique d'Einstein (1917)
 La gravifique Einsteinienne (1921)
 Introduction à la gravifique einsteinienne (1925)
 Théorie mathématique de l'électricité (1925)
 Théorie des champs gravifiques (1926)
 Application de la gravifique einsteinienne (1930)
 Théorie invariantive du calcul des variations (1931)

See also
Chemical affinity
Chemical thermodynamics
Extent of reaction
Schrödinger equation
de Donder gauge
de Donder–Weyl theory

References

External links

Theophile de Donder - Science World at Wolfram.com
Prigogine on de Donder
De Donder's math genealogy
De Donder's academic tree

1872 births
1957 deaths
Belgian physicists
Belgian mathematicians
Belgian chemists
Thermodynamicists
Free University of Brussels (1834–1969) alumni